Banzhong She Ethnic Township is a township of Fu'an City, northeastern Fujian Province, People's Republic of China. It is one of the three such divisions established for the city's population of the She people, alongside Muyun and Kangcuo Townships.

The township's administrative area ranges in latitude from 26° 02' to 27° 10' N and in longitude from 119° 34' 10" to 119° 40' 40".

References

Township-level divisions of Fujian
She ethnic townships